The chapters of the manga series Binbō Shimai Monogatari, written and illustrated by Izumi Kazuto, were serialized in Shogakukan's seinen manga magazine Monthly Sunday Gene-X from May 2004 to November 2006. Shogakukan collected its chapters in four tankōbon volumes, released from August 12, 2005, to December 19, 2006. The story revolves around two orphaned sisters, high school student Kyō Yamada and elementary school student Asu Yamada, who lives alone.



Volume list

References 

Binbo Shimai Monogatari